Sirakorola is a small town and commune in the Cercle of Koulikoro in the Koulikoro Region of south-western Mali. As of 1998 the commune had a population of 27859. 
It is located 18 kilometres from Koulikoro city.

References

Communes of Koulikoro Region